The Justice Party is a social liberal, social democratic and a progressivist political party in Azerbaijan. Its candidate Ilyas Ismayilov won 0.8% of the popular vote in the 15 October 2003 presidential elections.

History 

Justice (Adalet) Party was created in Baku, Azerbaijan by Ilyas Ismayilov in 1993. It has been merged with Azerbaijani Democratic Party in 1996. By being recreated in year of 2000, it started to function again.

See also 
Liberalism
Contributions to liberal theory
Liberalism worldwide
List of liberal parties
Liberal democracy

Anti-corruption parties
Azerbaijani democracy movements
Liberal parties in Azerbaijan
Political parties established in 1993
Political parties in Azerbaijan
Social democratic parties in Azerbaijan